This is a list of right-wing terrorist attacks. Right-wing terrorism  is terrorism that is motivated by a variety of different right-wing and far-right ideologies, most prominently by neo-Nazism, neo-fascism, ecofascism, white nationalism, white separatism, ethnonationalism, religious nationalism, anti-government patriot/sovereign citizen, anti-abortionism, and tax resistance.

1950s

1960s

1970s

1980s

1990s

2000s

2010s

2020s

See also 
 List of terrorist incidents
 List of Islamist terrorist attacks

Notes

References 

Terrorism-related lists
Far-right terrorism